The LG Amsterdam Tournament 2006 was a pre-season football tournament contested by Ajax, Porto, Internazionale and Manchester United on 4 August and 5 August 2006 at the Amsterdam ArenA.

Table

NB: An extra point is awarded for each goal scored.

Results

Day 1

Day 2

External links
Official site

2006
2006–07 in Dutch football
2006–07 in English football
2006–07 in Portuguese football
2006–07 in Italian football

it:Torneo di Amsterdam#2006